BIAF stands for Bulgarian International Air Festival; (Български Международен Авиационен Фестивал / Balgarski Meschdunaroden Awiazionen Festiwal / Bulgarisches Internationales Luftfahrt Festival).

It is an international airshow held on Krumovo Airbase, the military part of Plovdiv International Airport. It has been held every 2 years since 2007. The latest event was the 20th, 22nd, 27th, 28th, 29 September and the 2nd, 4th, 5th & 6 October 2013.

BIAF 2011 
The theme of this year's show was 100 Years of the Bulgarian Airforce

The show was divided into 3 section :

 The Past : Albatros, Kaproni, Dar-1, Laz-7 and Ме-109.
 The Present : Galeb, Swiss Air Force PC 7 Team, BGR AF heute
 The Future : JAS 39 Grippen, Eurofighter Typhoon and MiG-29OVT.

As usual several neighbouring and coalition countries took part in the show with their Airforces.

Dynamic display from:
 Bulgarian Air Force – G 21, MiG 29A, PC9M, C 27J, Mi 17, Mi 24, Bell 206, AS 532AL, SU 25K
 Swiss Air Force – PC 7 Team
 Bulgarian Air Sport Ltd : Pitts – S2B LZ–AIR, Piper Dakota Turbo PA-28-201T
 Bulgarian organization for flight education Ratan LZ-TSA – Sting 2000 RG; LZ-RSS – Sting 2000; LZ-HPM – Sting 2000
 Romanian Air Force – IAR 99 SOIM
 German Air Force – EF Typhoon
 Russia, RSK MiG – MiG 29M ОVT

Static display from:
 Bulgarian Air Force – Mi 17, C-27J, PC 9M, SU 25 UBK, AS 532AL, MiG 21, MiG 29 UB
 Bulgarian Association of Light Aviation 
 Bulgarian Aeromodeling Federation
 АК Galeb, Serbia – Galeb
 Flying club "Hawks", Romania
 Swedish Air Force - Gripen JAS 39
 Romanian Air Force  – C 27J
 Italian Air Force – EF Typhoon
 Greek Air Force – Т 6
 German Air Force – С160 Transall

Gold Sponsors 
with their own pavilion

 SAAB – Sweden
 EADS / CASSIDIAN – Germany
 Lockheed Martin – USA
 Diehl Defence- Germany

External links 

 BIAF 2011 Offizielle Webseite

Autumn events in Bulgaria
Sports festivals in Bulgaria
Trade fairs in Bulgaria
Economy of Plovdiv
Sport in Plovdiv
Air shows